Saint-Sauveur (Languedocien: Sent Salvador) is a commune in the Haute-Garonne department in southwestern France.

Population

Sights
The Church of St Saviour, historical monument.

See also
Communes of the Haute-Garonne department

References

Communes of Haute-Garonne